Band Aid  was the collective name of a charity supergroup featuring mainly British and Irish musicians and recording artists. It was founded in 1984 by Bob Geldof and Midge Ure to raise money for anti-famine efforts in Ethiopia by releasing the song "Do They Know It's Christmas?" for the Christmas market that year. On 25 November 1984, the song was recorded at Sarm West Studios in Notting Hill, London, and was released in the UK on Monday 3 December.  The single surpassed the hopes of the producers to become the Christmas number one on that release. Three re-recordings of the song to raise further money for charity also topped the charts, first the Band Aid II version in 1989 and the Band Aid 20 version in 2004 and finally the Band Aid 30 version in 2014. The original was produced by Ure. The 12" version was mixed by Trevor Horn.

Background
The supergroup was formed by Bob Geldof, who was then lead singer of the Irish band the Boomtown Rats. The BBC played a major role in capturing the poverty affecting Ethiopian citizens and thereby influenced Geldof to take action. Paula Yates, Bob Geldof's partner, is considered to have been the brains behind the original Band Aid. It was she who became the driving force that inspired (and helped) Geldof to rally the most famous pop stars of the 1980s to raise money for famine relief in Ethiopia.

The group was composed of forty artists to raise awareness and funds for the Ethiopian famine in 1983–1985. The group's name stemmed from the idea that the musicians were providing aid to the less fortunate and suggested that their project was likened to putting a band-aid on a wound. Geldof was looking for support from all nations for Africa beginning in the United Kingdom. To do so, the artists recorded a hit single titled "Do They Know It's Christmas?" depicting the poverty-stricken African scenery of the time. Lyrics of the song included a description of the country saying, "where nothing ever grows, no rain or rivers flow, do they know it's Christmas time at all?" Ethiopia follows the Orthodox calendar where Christmas is celebrated on the seventh of January; however, when the song was recorded (during the 1983–1985 famine in Ethiopia), the country had a Communist government and as such, religious festivals were not celebrated.

Original Band Aid

Chronology (1984)
Geldof was so moved by the plight of starving children in Ethiopia that he decided to try to raise money using his contacts in pop music. Geldof enlisted the help of Midge Ure, from the group Ultravox, to produce a charity record. Ure took Geldof's lyrics, and created the melody and backing track for the record. Geldof called many of the most popular British and Irish performers of the time, persuading them to donate their time. His one criterion for selection was how famous they were, to maximise sales of the record. He then kept an appointment to appear on a show on BBC Radio 1, with Richard Skinner, but instead of promoting the new Boomtown Rats material as planned, he announced the plan for Band Aid.

The recording studio gave Band Aid no more than 24 free hours to record and mix the record, on 25 November 1984. The recording took place at SARM Studios in Notting Hill between 11 am and 7 pm, and was filmed by director Nigel Dick to be released as the pop video though some basic tracks had been recorded the day before at Midge Ure's home studio. The first tracks to be recorded were the group / choir choruses which were filmed by the international press. The footage was rushed to newsrooms where it aired while the recording process continued. Later, drums by Phil Collins were recorded. The introduction of the song features a slowed-down sample from a Tears for Fears track called "The Hurting", released in 1983. Tony Hadley, of Spandau Ballet, was the first to record his vocal, while a section sung by Status Quo was deemed unusable, and replaced with section comprising Paul Weller, Sting, and Glenn Gregory from Heaven 17. Simon Le Bon from Duran Duran sang between contributions from George Michael and Sting. Paul Young has since admitted, in a documentary, that he knew his opening lines were written for David Bowie, who was not able to make the recording but made a contribution to the B-side (Bowie performed his lines at the Live Aid concert the following year). Boy George arrived last, at 6 pm, after Geldof woke him up by phone telling Boy George that he wanted him on the song. George's group Culture Club were currently touring the US and George caught a Concorde jet from New York City to London, at his own expense, to record his solo part.

The following morning, Geldof appeared on the Radio 1 breakfast show with Mike Read, to promote the record further and promise that every penny would go to the cause. This led to a stand-off with the British government, who refused to waive the VAT on the sales of the single. Geldof made the headlines by publicly standing up to Prime Minister Margaret Thatcher and, sensing the strength of public feeling, the government donated the tax to charity as well.

The record was released on 3 December 1984, and went straight to No. 1 in the UK singles chart, outselling all the other records in the chart put together. It became the fastest-selling single of all time in the UK, selling a million copies in the first week alone. It stayed at No. 1 for five weeks, selling over three million copies and becoming easily the biggest-selling single of all time in the UK, thus beating the seven-year record held by "Mull of Kintyre". It has since been surpassed by Elton John's "Candle in the Wind 1997" (his tribute to Diana, Princess of Wales) but it is likely to keep selling in different versions for many years to come. In 1986 the original music video from "Do They Know It's Christmas?" won Band Aid a Grammy Award nomination for Best Music Video, Short Form.

After Live Aid, "Do They Know It's Christmas?" was re-released in late 1985 in a set that included a special-edition 'picture disc' version, modelled after the Live Aid logo with 'Band' in place of 'Live'. An added bonus, "One Year On" (a statement from Geldof and Ure on the telephone) was available as a B-side. A transcript of "One Year On" can be found in a booklet which was included in the DVD set of Live Aid, the first disc of which features the BBC news report, as well as the Band Aid video.

Live Aid inspired a number of charity events, such as Media Aid, which raised money for Save the Children.

1984 performers

Vocalists:
Robert "Kool" Bell (Kool & the Gang)
Bono (U2)
Boy George (Culture Club)
Pete Briquette (The Boomtown Rats)
Adam Clayton (U2)
Phil Collins (Genesis and solo artist)
Chris Cross (Ultravox)
Simon Crowe (The Boomtown Rats)
Sara Dallin (Bananarama)
Siobhan Fahey (Bananarama)
Johnny Fingers (The Boomtown Rats)
Bob Geldof (The Boomtown Rats)
Glenn Gregory (Heaven 17)
Tony Hadley (Spandau Ballet)
John Keeble (Spandau Ballet)
Gary Kemp (Spandau Ballet)
Martin Kemp (Spandau Ballet)
Simon Le Bon (Duran Duran)
Marilyn
George Michael (Wham!)
Jon Moss (Culture Club)
Steve Norman (Spandau Ballet)
Rick Parfitt (Status Quo)

Nick Rhodes (Duran Duran)
Francis Rossi (Status Quo)
Sting (The Police)
Andy Taylor (Duran Duran)
James "J.T." Taylor (Kool & the Gang)
John Taylor (Duran Duran)
Roger Taylor (Duran Duran)
Dennis Thomas (Kool & the Gang)
Midge Ure (Ultravox)
Martyn Ware (Heaven 17)
Jody Watley (Shalamar)
Paul Weller (The Style Council)
Keren Woodward (Bananarama)
Paul Young

Additional spoken messages on B-side:
Stuart Adamson, Mark Brzezicki, Tony Butler, Bruce Watson (Big Country)
David Bowie
Holly Johnson (Frankie Goes to Hollywood)
Paul McCartney (The Beatles) 

Instrumentalists:
Phil Collins – drums
John Taylor – bass
Andy Taylor – guitar
Midge Ure – keyboards and programming

Effectiveness

The hit single "Do They Know It's Christmas?" was highly successful worldwide. It sold over two million copies around the globe and raised more than $24 million (USD). The super group's success was seen as a large increase in Celebrity Diplomacy and inspired similar actions of support from countries such as Canada, France, Spain and the United States. The success influenced two organisations of live benefit concerts run by Celebrity Charity. The concerts were USA for Africa and Live Aid and were broadcast in over 160 countries. Band Aid and Live Aid combined raised about $150 million (USD) for the famine relief effort in Ethiopia.

Band Aid II
This version, released in 1989, was produced by a British songwriting and production team formed by Mike Stock, Matt Aitken and Pete Waterman known as Stock Aitken Waterman. The only artists from the original Band Aid to be featured again on this version were Sara Dallin and Keren Woodward of Bananarama. This version topped the UK Singles Chart for three weeks.

Production
On Friday 1 December 1989, Bob Geldof called Pete Waterman to ask if he would consider producing a new version of the song featuring the big stars from that time. Waterman immediately postponed his wedding and began calling up the artists. With just two days' notice, on Sunday 3 December, recording took place at PWL Studios in South London. Present in the studio was Bob Geldof, wife Paula Yates and six-year-old daughter Fifi Trixiebelle, who was eager to meet Jason Donovan.

Production continued through the Monday, and by Tuesday 5 December the song was broadcast for the first time on London's Capital Radio. Advance sales of the record reached 500,000. The song was released the following week on 11 December and spent three weeks at number one, becoming the ninth biggest-selling song of the year.

1989 performers

Vocalists:
Bananarama
Big Fun
Bros
Cathy Dennis
D Mob
Jason Donovan
Kevin Godley
Glen Goldsmith
Kylie Minogue
The Pasadenas
Chris Rea
Cliff Richard
Jimmy Somerville
Sonia
Lisa Stansfield
Technotronic
Wet Wet Wet

Musicians:
Matt Aitken – keyboards & guitar
Luke Goss (Bros) – drums
Chris Rea – guitar
Mike Stock – keyboards

Band Aid 20

Band Aid 20 was the 2004 incarnation of the charity group Band Aid. The group, which included Daniel Bedingfield, Justin Hawkins of the Darkness, Chris Martin of Coldplay, Bono of U2, and Paul McCartney, re-recorded "Do They Know It's Christmas?". The song reached No. 1 on 6 November 2004, spent four weeks at that position and became the biggest-selling single of 2004.

2004 performers

Vocalists:
Tim Wheeler (Ash)
Daniel Bedingfield
Natasha Bedingfield
Bono (U2)
James Bourne (Busted)
Keisha Buchanan (Sugababes)
Mutya Buena (Sugababes)
Ben Carrigan (The Thrills)
Tom Chaplin (Keane)
Nathan Connolly (Snow Patrol)
Conor Deasy (The Thrills)
Dido – performed separately from a studio in Melbourne
Dizzee Rascal – the only artist to add lyrics to the song
Ms Dynamite
Skye Edwards (Morcheeba)
Estelle
Neil Hannon (The Divine Comedy)
Justin Hawkins (The Darkness)
Fran Healy (Travis)
Taka Hirose (Feeder)
Kevin Horan (The Thrills)
Jamelia
Beverley Knight
Olly Knights (Turin Brakes)
Lemar
Shaznay Lewis (All Saints)
Gary Lightbody (Snow Patrol)
Russell Mael (Sparks)
Chris Martin (Coldplay)
Mark McClelland (Snow Patrol)
Padraic McMahon (The Thrills)
Katie Melua
Róisín Murphy (Moloko)
Grant Nicholas (Feeder)
Gale Paridjanan (Turin Brakes)
Jonny Quinn (Snow Patrol)
Heidi Range (Sugababes)
Tim Rice-Oxley (Keane)
Mark Richardson (Feeder)
Daniel Ryan (The Thrills)

Charlie Simpson (Busted)
Rachel Stevens
Joss Stone
Robbie Williams – performed separately from a studio in Los Angeles
Matt Willis (Busted)
Will Young

Musicians:
Danny Goffey (Supergrass) – drums
Jonny Greenwood (Radiohead) – guitar
Dan Hawkins (The Darkness) – guitar
Justin Hawkins (The Darkness) – guitar
Paul McCartney – bass guitar
Thom Yorke (Radiohead) – piano

Additional personnel:
Damon Albarn – tea boy
Bob Geldof – organiser
Nigel Godrich – producer
Midge Ure – executive producer

Band Aid 30

Band Aid 30 was the 2014 incarnation of the charity supergroup Band Aid. Announced by Bob Geldof and Midge Ure, the aim was to aid 2014 Ebola outbreak victims in Western Africa and preventing its spread. As in previous incarnations, the group covered the track "Do They Know It's Christmas?", written in 1984 by Geldof and Ure. The song was recorded by some of the biggest-selling current British and Irish pop acts, including One Direction, Sam Smith, Ed Sheeran, Emeli Sandé, Ellie Goulding Rita Ora and Bastille, along with Chris Martin (Coldplay) and Bono (U2)—the third time he contributed to a Band Aid recording.

Their version of the song debuted at the chart's summit during the week of its release, then dropped down a place in each of the following two weeks before dropping out of the Top 10 in its fourth week. It also received a polarised reception from many music critics due to its new lyric directed towards Africa.

Also, for the first time, a German version was produced and reached the top position of the German single charts at the beginning of December 2014. The project is led by Geldof's close friend Campino, lead vocalist of the punk rock band Die Toten Hosen. A French version of the song is led by Carla Bruni.

2014 performers

Vocalists:
Bono (U2)
Clean Bandit
Paloma Faith
Guy Garvey (Elbow)
Ellie Goulding
Niall Horan (One Direction)
Angélique Kidjo
Zayn Malik (One Direction)
Chris Martin (Coldplay)
Olly Murs
Sinéad O'Connor
Rita Ora
Liam Payne (One Direction)
Emeli Sandé
Seal
Alfie Deyes
Joe Sugg
Zoella

Ed Sheeran
Dan Smith (Bastille)
Sam Smith
Harry Styles (One Direction)
Louis Tomlinson (One Direction)
Underworld
Jessie Ware

Musicians:
Milan Neil Amin-Smith (Clean Bandit) – violin
Grace Chatto (Clean Bandit) – cello
Roger Taylor (Queen) – drums, keyboards
Ed Sheeran – guitar
Sinéad O'Connor – bass, guitar

Remixes:
Underworld

Additional personnel:
Paul Epworth – producer

Related projects
The Band Aid project inspired other charity records around the world, including "We Are the World" by USA for Africa in the United States, "Tears Are Not Enough" by Northern Lights in Canada, and many others.

A compilation of computer games for the Commodore 64 and ZX Spectrum was published under the name Soft Aid. Each platform had its own selection of games from ten different publishers; Elite Systems, Ocean Software, Quicksilva, and Virgin were represented on both. The cassette also featured a recording of the "Do They Know It's Christmas?" single.

Band Aid Liverpool
In December 2020, a group of musicians from Liverpool recorded a version of "Do They Know It's Christmas?" as a charity record in support of Shelter. Retitled "Do They Know It's Christmas (Feed the World)" with lyrics referring to places on Merseyside, the project was given the go-ahead by Bob Geldof and Midge Ure to release their cover version on 10 December 2020. Band Aid Liverpool features about 70 musicians/personalities from Liverpool, including Asa Murphy from BBC Radio Merseyside, five-piece band the Hummingbirds and project originator Tony Cook, from tribute band the Mersey Beatles.

Criticism and controversies

Claims of self-righteousness
In 1986, the anarchist band Chumbawamba released the album Pictures of Starving Children Sell Records, as well as an EP entitled "We Are the World", jointly recorded with US band A State of Mind, both of which were intended as anti-capitalist critiques of the Band Aid/Live Aid phenomenon. They argued that the record was primarily a cosmetic spectacle, designed to draw attention away from the real political causes of world hunger.

In a 1985 Time Out interview, Morrissey (who was not invited to participate in Band Aid) gave his views about the song:
'I'm not afraid to say that I think Band Aid was diabolical. Or to say that I think Bob Geldof is a nauseating character. Many people find that very unsettling, but I'll say it as loud as anyone wants me to. In the first instance the record itself was absolutely tuneless. One can have great concern for the people of Ethiopia, but it's another thing to inflict daily torture on the people of Great Britain. It was an awful record considering the mass of talent involved. And it wasn't done shyly. It was the most self-righteous platform ever in the history of popular music.'

References

Bibliography

External links
 
 Documentary: Making of Band Aid Part I
 Documentary: Making of Band Aid Part II
 Band Aid at WorldMusicDatabase

Musical advocacy groups
Charities based in London
Development charities based in the United Kingdom
British pop music groups
Musical groups established in 1984
1984 establishments in the United Kingdom
Charity supergroups
British supergroups